Clepitoides gerardi is a species of beetle in the family Cerambycidae. It was described by Clarke in 2009.

References

Rhinotragini
Beetles described in 2009